Stefan Carey (born 25 January 1976) is a former Australian rules footballer who played with the Sydney Swans and Brisbane Lions in the Australian Football League (AFL). His father George played five games with Fitzroy in 1966.

External links

1976 births
Living people
Australian rules footballers from New South Wales
Sydney Swans players
Brisbane Lions players
Allies State of Origin players
Pennant Hills Australian Football Club players